{{Infobox language
|name=Teribe
|nativename=Térraba, Tiribi, Teribe, Norteño, Quequexque, Naso Tjerdi
|states= Panama, Costa Rica
|region=In Panama:Bocas del Toro Province, Chiriquí Province.In Costa Rica:Limón Province, Puntarenas Province.|ethnicity=Naso people
|speakers=3,300
|date=2007
|ref=e18
|familycolor=American
|fam1        = Chibchan
|fam2        = Talamanca
|iso3=tfr
|glotto=teri1250
|glottorefname=Teribe
}}Teribe''' is a language spoken by the Naso or Teribe Indians; it is used primarily in the Bocas del Toro Province of northwestern Panama and in the southern part of Costa Rica's Puntarenas Province, but is almost extinct in the latter. It is part of the Chibchan language family, in the Talamanca branch.  There are currently about 3,000 speakers, nearly all of whom speak Spanish as well. The language is of the OVS type. Its ISO 639-3 code is tfr.

Writing system

Teribe also uses the ll with diaeresis centered over the letters.

References

External links 
 Teribe phonology

Languages of Panama
Languages of Costa Rica
Chibchan languages
Object–verb–subject languages